Mohamed Nasir Nabil Abdul Rashid bin Suleman Obineche, known as Nabil Abdulrashid (born 3 September 1985) is an English comedian of Nigerian descent. In 2010, at the age of 25, he became the youngest black comedian to perform stand-up at the Hammersmith Apollo.

Early life
Abdulrashid was born in North London, England to a medical doctor father and a politician/businesswoman mother.

During the 1940-1950s, Abdulrashid's father studied medicine in Soviet Union (now Russia), whilst the Soviets were training African doctors. His father married his first wife, an Afghan woman, during the Russo-Afghan War. His father then moved to England and opened up a hospital. He then moved back to Nigeria, where he met Abdul Rashid's mother.

After moving back to England, in 1990, Abdulrashid and his family moved to Kaduna, Northern Nigeria. He travelled around the world at young age and had a private school education. He attended Essence International School.

In 2006, he moved back to England to live in South Croydon, Surrey. In 2012, Abdulrashid graduated with a BA in Drama and Applied theatre from St. Mary's University College in Twickenham.

Career
In 2010, at the age of 25, Abdulrashid became the youngest black comedian to perform stand-up at the Hammersmith Apollo. He entered the "Which Religion Is Funniest?" competition, after reaching the Top 10 spot, he was crowned joint winner of the national competition, judged by David Baddiel and Omid Djalili, and he was chosen to perform at the premiere of the film The Infidel.

Abdulrashid has performed at Comedy Cafe, Comedy Store, Jongleurs and Choice FM Comedy Club.

From 2009 to 2010, Abdulrashid wrote, acted and directed on The Show Sho Show, which aired on Channel AKA. He has written for comedians on panel shows and worked on a sketch show with the producers of Little Miss Jocelyn and 3 Non-Blondes.

Abdulrashid has toured with his religious comedy show Don't Panic, I'm Islamic! In July 2011, he toured four UK cities in the Peace Youth and Community Trust's (PYCT) first Muslim Comedy Tour, alongside comedians Jeff Mirza, Nazim Ali, Humza Arshad and Prince Abdi. In November 2011, he took his Asia vs. Africa Comedy Clash show to ten cities around the United Kingdom. In May 2012, he spent two weeks using theatre to educate children in Malawi on HIV.

Abdulrashid delivers a comedy workshop encouraging inner-city children to use comedy as an alternative form of expression children at schools across London.

In January 2013, Abdulrashid co-founded Norbury Comedy Club with Ola Gbaja. A show is due to take place every Sunday in partnership with Baba Foundation restaurant.

In April 2013, Abdulrashid appeared on Channel 4's 4thought.tv. In October 2014, he performed on BBC Local Radio.

In July 2015, he performed at Eid Special Comedy Night at The Comedy Store in London.

In December 2016, he appeared on two-part BBC Two documentary Muslims Like Us.

In May 2020, he appeared on Britain's Got Talent and got a Golden Buzzer from Alesha Dixon which took him straight to the semi final. In October, after winning the judges vote, he advanced to the final where he finished in 4th place. Almost 1,000 people complained about his performance in the semi-final and another 2,200 about the final. They were all rejected by media watchdog Ofcom who said "The comedian's satirical take on his life experiences as a black Muslim was likely to have been within audience expectations."

In April 2021, he was announced as a contestant on Celebrity Masterchef.

Comedy style
Abdulrashid switches from surreal to satirical in his dichotomy of being a middle-class educated man yet simultaneously a street-smart urban youth while avoiding clichés when dealing with topics such as being a black Muslim in South London. He switches accent and languages, speaking French, Patois, Urdu and Somali and Chaucer and blends them into his material.

Conviction
In 2006, Abdulrashid was convicted of fraud, after a drug importation trial against him collapsed. He was sentenced to 3 years, but was released after serving a 15 month prison term.

Views
In August 2011, Abdulrashid responded on YouTube to David Starkey's comments on the BBC's Newsnight programme, made during a discussion about the England riots, claiming that "the whites have become black" and that "a particular sort of violent, destructive, nihilistic, gangster culture has become the fashion". Abdulrashid responded with a historically realistic response.

In May 2013, Abdulrashid responded on YouTube to the murder of Lee Rigby in Woolwich on 22 May 2013, outlining his perception of alleged media double standards and far-right wing groups using the circumstances as propaganda to justify their own views.

Personal life
Abdulrashid suffers from attention deficit hyperactivity disorder. He also campaigns for fighting against knife and gun crime.

In September 2011, Abdulrashid married. His wife is British Pakistani-Punjabi. They have two daughters.

See also
Islamic humour
British Nigerian

References

External links

1985 births
21st-century English comedians
Living people
English Muslims
English people of Hausa descent
English people of Igbo descent
English stand-up comedians
English comedy writers
Muslim male comedians
Black British male comedians
English video bloggers
Comedians from London
People from Croydon
Alumni of Goldsmiths, University of London
Alumni of St Mary's University, Twickenham
Male bloggers
Britain's Got Talent contestants
British people convicted of fraud
British fraudsters